Valentina Ilieva (born 12 March 1962), later Kharalampieva, is a Bulgarian female former volleyball player who competed in the 1980 Summer Olympics.

In 1980 she was part of the Bulgarian team which won the bronze medal in the Olympic tournament. She played two matches.

References 
 

1962 births
Living people
Bulgarian women's volleyball players
Volleyball players at the 1980 Summer Olympics
Olympic volleyball players of Bulgaria
Olympic bronze medalists for Bulgaria
Olympic medalists in volleyball
Medalists at the 1980 Summer Olympics